The Finance Act 2007 is an Act of the Parliament of the United Kingdom prescribing changes to Excise Duties, Value Added Tax, Income Tax, Corporation Tax and Capital Gains Tax. It enacts the Budget of 21 March 2007.

In the UK, the Chancellor delivers an annual Budget speech outlining changes in spending, tax and duty. The respective year's Finance Act is the mechanism to enact the changes.

The rules governing the various taxation methods are contained within the relevant taxation acts. (For instance Capital Gains Tax Legislation is contained within Taxation of Chargeable Gains Act 1992). The Finance Act details amendments to be made to each one of these Acts.

References

Sources
Halsbury's Statutes

External links
The Finance Act 2007, as amended from the National Archives.
The Finance Act 2007, as originally enacted from the National Archives.

United Kingdom Acts of Parliament 2007
2007 in economics
Tax legislation in the United Kingdom